The Society of Friends Hall is a historic Society of Friends meeting house located at 172-174 Ridge Street in Glens Falls, Warren County, New York. It is attributed to architect Marcus F. Cummings and built in 1875.  It is a two-story, rectangular, Italianate style brick religious building.  It features tall rounded arched windows and small corner towers with buttresses.

It was added to the National Register of Historic Places in 1984.

References

Churches on the National Register of Historic Places in New York (state)
Italianate architecture in New York (state)
Churches completed in 1875
Quaker meeting houses in New York (state)
Buildings and structures in Warren County, New York
National Register of Historic Places in Warren County, New York